The Knockout is a 1914 American silent comedy film starring Roscoe "Fatty" Arbuckle.  It also features Charlie Chaplin in a small role, his seventeenth film for Keystone Studios.  It is one of only a few films in which Chaplin's Little Tramp character appears in a secondary role, not appearing until the second half of the film. It also stars Arbuckle's wife, Minta Durfee, Edgar Kennedy and Keystone owner, Mack Sennett in a minor role as a spectator. The film was directed by Charles Avery.

Plot

Two down-and-out hoboes pretend to be pugilists in order to make some money to eat. One of them claims to be Cyclone Flynn, the boxing champion. In the meantime Pug, a good-hearted local strongman, has fought and defeated several mashers who were bothering his girlfriend. The mashers make up with Pug and propose to enter him to fight the fake Cyclone Flynn at a local theater.

Enter the real Cyclone Flynn, who expels the hoboes and takes over the engagement. The fight starts, comically refereed by Chaplin's character. It quickly deteriorates into chaos, after Pug steals a gambler's revolvers and chases the champion from the ring. A long chase sequence involving the boxers, spectators, Pug's girlfriend, and the Keystone Kops follows.

Review
A reviewer from Moving Picture World wrote, "Roscoe Arbuckle, ably supported, makes barrels of fun in this two-reel comedy release. In its early stages, the story has a particularly well connected plot, but things go to smash a little in this line when a big chase is introduced in the second reel. This chase, as well as a comedy prize fight, is unusually funny."

Cast
 Roscoe 'Fatty' Arbuckle - Pug
 Minta Durfee - Pug's girlfriend
 Edgar Kennedy - Cyclone Flynn
 Charles Chaplin - Referee
 Frank Opperman - Fight promoter
 Al St. John - Pug's rival
 Hank Mann - Tough
 Mack Swain - Gambler

See also
 Charlie Chaplin filmography
 Fatty Arbuckle filmography

External links
 
 
 
 

1914 films
1910s sports comedy films
American black-and-white films
American sports comedy films
American silent short films
American boxing films
Films produced by Mack Sennett
Keystone Studios films
Articles containing video clips
1914 comedy films
Films directed by Charles Avery
1910s American films
Silent American comedy films
Silent sports comedy films